Ibrahim Attahiru   (10 August 1966 – 21 May 2021) was a Nigerian army lieutenant general who served as the Chief of Army Staff from 26 January 2021 to 21 May 2021 when he died in the 2021 NAF Beechcraft B300 King Air 350i crash near Kaduna International Airport.

Early life and education 
Attahiru was born on 10 August 1966 in Doka, Kaduna North Local Government Area, Kaduna State. He was a graduate of the Nigerian Defence Academy, Armed Forces Command and Staff College, and Nigerian Army School of Infantry. He commenced officer cadet training in January 1984 and was commissioned as a Second Lieutenant in December 1986 as an Infantry Officer. He held a master's degree in Strategic Management and Policy Studies from the Nigerian Defence Academy. He also attained a Masters of Science in Human Resources Management and Development from Salford University in the United Kingdom and a Graduate Diploma in International Studies from the University of Nairobi.

Military career 
He had a tour of duty with the United Nations in Sierra Leone as a Military Observer, where he facilitated Operation Barras in September 2000. He was an operations officer for ECOMOG Operations in Liberia.

As a staff officer, he was Chief of Defence Transformation and Innovation and Chief of Defence Logistics at Defence Headquarters Abuja. In that position, he worked with the Defence Logistics Agency on enhancing the operational readiness in the Armed Forces of Nigeria. He was an Instructor at the Nigerian Defence Academy and the Nigerian Army School of Infantry. He was later a directing staff and Chief Instructor at the Armed Forces Command and Staff College, Jaji – Kaduna.

He was at the National Defence College in Kenya for the National Defence Management and Security Studies Course and at the Chinese People's Liberation Army Special Forces Academy Shijiazhuang-Hubei Province, China for the Basic and Advanced Special/Operations Commando Forces Courses. He undertook leadership and security policy course at the prestigious Kennedy School of Government, Harvard University USA, Graduate School of Media and Communication, Agha Khan University of Nairobi, Bournemouth University Disaster Management Center, and the Geneva Centre for Security Policy.

Death

On the evening of 21 May 2021 Attahiru was traveling on a Nigerian Air Force Beechcraft King Air 350 on an official visit to Kaduna, where he was to attend the Passing out Parade of 80RRI in Depot Nigerian Army on 22 May 2021. During the journey the plane crashed, killing Attahiru and all ten other people on board.

Awards and recommendations 
The General had several honors and awards. He was a highly decorated officer with UNAMSIL Medal, ECOMOG Medal, Forces Service Star, Meritorious Service Star, Distinguish Service Star, Grand Service Star, Corp Medal of Honour, Command medal, Field Command Medal, and Field Command Medal of Honour.

References 

1966 births
2021 deaths
Chiefs of Army Staff (Nigeria)
Nigerian Army officers
Nigerian Defence Academy alumni
People from Kaduna State
Victims of aviation accidents or incidents in 2021
Victims of aviation accidents or incidents in Nigeria